This is a list of the National Register of Historic Places listings in Albany County, Wyoming. It is intended to be a complete list of the properties and districts on the National Register of Historic Places in Albany County, Wyoming, United States. The locations of National Register properties and districts for which the latitude and longitude coordinates are included below, may be seen in a map.

There are 41 properties and districts listed on the National Register in the county, of which one is also a National Historic Landmark.

Current listings

|}

See also 

 List of National Historic Landmarks in Wyoming
 National Register of Historic Places listings in Wyoming

References 

Wyoming State Historical Preservation Office

Albany